William Guy  BDA FDS LLD (1859-1950) was a British pioneer of modern dentistry and the widespread use of anaesthesia. He was instrumental in the creation of the 1921 Dentists Act in the United Kingdom.

Life
He was born in Biddenden in Kent on 3 December 1859, the son of Dr William Guy of Norwich, and attended Norwich Grammar School. He received a Licentiate from the Royal College of Surgeons of Edinburgh in 1892
In 1899 he succeeded William Bowman MacLeod as Dean of the Edinburgh Dental Hospital and served this role for 40 years. The final 5 years (1935-1939) were in a transition period with Arthur Cyril William Hutchison, who eventually replaced him fully in 1939.

From October 1899 (prior to its customary use in clinical surgery) he was the first person to employ permanent anaesthetists in the UK. At the peak of his career he was practising from a surgery at 11 Wemyss Place in western Edinburgh. The property had previously been the dental practice of John Smith.

In May 1911 he was elected a Fellow of the Royal Society of Edinburgh. His proposers included William Spiers Bruce and Thomas Smith Clouston.

In 1914 he was elected President of the British Dental Association. 
In the First World War he served as a military surgeon, at home in Scotland, being employed at Craigleith Hospital (the Second Scottish Military Hospital), specialising in facial reconstruction. In 1917 he was promoted to Major.

He died in Edinburgh in 1950 and is buried with his wife Beatrice in a north section of the original Dean Cemetery in western Edinburgh.

Memorials

The William Guy Memorial Lecture is named in his memory.

Publications

Mostly Memories – Some Digressions autobiography (1948)

Family

Guy married Helen Beatrice Smith in 1895. They had no children.

References

1859 births
1950 deaths
Academics of the University of Edinburgh
Scottish surgeons
Scottish dentists
People associated with Edinburgh
People from Biddenden
19th-century Scottish medical doctors
Royal Army Medical Corps officers
Burials at the Dean Cemetery
People educated at Norwich School